Close combat is a violent physical confrontation between two or more opponents at short range.

Close combat may also refer to:

Hand-to-hand combat
Close Combat (series), a series of real-time tactical computer games
Close Combat (video game), the first game in the series
Close Combat, a 1993 book by W.E.B. Griffin in The Corps Series
Close Combat, a technical manual in the Marine Corps Martial Arts Program